Erich Miß (born 16 March 1948) is a retired German football defender.

References

External links
 

1948 births
Living people
German footballers
Bundesliga players
2. Bundesliga players
Wuppertaler SV players
VfL Bochum players
Sportspeople from Wuppertal
Association football defenders
Footballers from North Rhine-Westphalia